The parish of Doonside is an Australian  cadastral parish in  the NSW county of Narromine. It is located approximately midway between Tottenham and Narromine and is in Narromine Shire.

The parish should not be confused with the western Sydney suburb of Doonside.

Approx

References

Parishes of Narromine County
Localities in New South Wales
Geography of New South Wales